The 1995 TVA Cup was a women's tennis tournament played on indoor carpet courts at the Aichi Prefectural Gymnasium in Nagoya, Japan that was part of Tier IV of the 1995 WTA Tour. It was the only edition of the tournament and was held from 12 September through 17 September 1995. Unseeded Linda Wild won the singles title.

Finals

Singles

 Linda Wild defeated  Sandra Kleinová 6–4, 6–2
 It was Wild's 2nd title of the year and the 6th of her career.

Doubles

 Kerry-Anne Guse /  Kristine Radford defeated  Rika Hiraki /  Sung-Hee Park 6–4, 6–4
 It was Guse's 1st title of the year and the 2nd of her career. It was Radford's 1st title of the year and the 3rd of her career.

References

External links
 WTA tournament edition details
 ITF tournament edition details

TVA Cup
TVA Cup
Carpet court tennis tournaments
Tennis tournaments in Japan
1995 in Japanese tennis
1995 in Japanese women's sport